The Senior women's race at the 1997 IAAF World Cross Country Championships was held in Torino, Italy, at the Parco del Valentino on March 23, 1997.  A report on the event was given in The New York Times, in the Herald, and for the IAAF.

Complete results, medallists, and the results of British athletes were published.

Race results

Senior women's race (6.6 km)

Individual

Teams

Note: Athletes in parentheses did not score for the team result

Participation
An unofficial count yields the participation of 147 athletes from 42 countries in the Senior women's race.  This is in agreement with the official numbers as published. Although announced, the athlete from the  did not show.

 (2)
 (1)
 (4)
 (4)
 (4)
 (1)
 (3)
 (4)
 (4)
 (1)
 (1)
 (6)
 (1)
 (6)
 (4)
 (4)
 (6)
 (1)
 (6)
 (2)
 (6)
 (6)
 (1)
 (4)
 (4)
 (6)
 (6)
 (6)
 (6)
 (1)
 (1)
 (6)
 (6)
 (1)
 (2)
 (1)
 (4)
 (1)
 (6)
 (6)
 (1)
 (1)

See also
 1997 IAAF World Cross Country Championships – Senior men's race
 1997 IAAF World Cross Country Championships – Junior men's race
 1997 IAAF World Cross Country Championships – Junior women's race

References

Senior women's race at the World Athletics Cross Country Championships
IAAF
1997 in women's athletics